Cedar Bench Wilderness is a protected wilderness area in the Prescott National Forest in the U.S. state of Arizona.  Established in 1984 under the Arizona Wilderness Act, the area protects the large "bench" that divides the Agua Fria and Verde River drainages.  Elevations range from 4,500 feet (1,371 m) to 6,700 feet (2,042 m) with vegetation that includes saguaro cactus along the Verde river to chaparral to smaller amounts of pinyon pine and Utah juniper along the high points.

See also
 List of Arizona Wilderness Areas
 List of U.S. Wilderness Areas

References

External links
 Cedar Bench Wilderness – Prescott National Forest

IUCN Category Ib
Wilderness areas of Arizona
Prescott National Forest
Protected areas of Yavapai County, Arizona
Protected areas established in 1984
1984 establishments in Arizona